George Burns is an American politician from the U.S. state of Oklahoma. A member of the Republican Party, he currently serves in the Oklahoma Senate as the elected member from the 5th District which encompasses parts of Atoka, Choctaw, LeFlore, McCurtain, and Pushmataha Counties. He was first elected in the 2020 Oklahoma Senate election after winning the Republican primary on June 30, 2020 and going on to win the general election on November 3, 2020. His current term expires in 2025.

Early life and career
Burns grew up in the Pollard community near Haworth, Oklahoma. He graduated from Haworth High School and Oklahoma State University Institute of Technology. He worked as an electrician and eventually as a manager for large scale mechanical construction projects. He later served on the board of directors for both the Choctaw Electric Cooperative and the Western Farmers Electric Cooperate until his election to the Oklahoma Senate.

Burns currently is a council member for Idabel Kiamichi Technology Center. He has four children and eight grandchildren.

Oklahoma Senate (2021-Present)
Burns has served in the 58th Oklahoma Legislature.

2020 Campaign
Oklahoma's 5th Senate District was open in the 2020 Oklahoma Senate election because incumbent Joseph Silk had stepped down to challenge Markwayne Mullin in the Republican primary for Oklahoma's 2nd congressional district. Burns ran as a Pro-Trump Republican. Burns advanced to a runoff election against fellow Pro-Trump Republican Justin Jackson. He won the runoff election by just 22 votes. He went on to win the general election by over three-fourths of the vote.

58th Legislature
Burns authored  SB 216 which aims to prevent any local or state government in Oklahoma from closing churches and other religious institutions during the COVID-19 pandemic.

Electoral history

2020

References

21st-century American politicians
Living people
Oklahoma State University alumni
Republican Party Oklahoma state senators
Year of birth missing (living people)